Jarrad Drizners (born 31 May 1999) is an Australian racing cyclist, who currently rides for UCI WorldTeam .

Career 
In January 2020, Drizners won the Under-23 national road race championship, which led to his inclusion in the Australian national team that competed at the 2020 Tour Down Under. There, he took the lead in the mountains classification after Stage 1 by being part of the day's breakaway group.

On 29 September 2021, it was announced that Drizners would be joining  in 2022 on a two-year deal, with the team citing his main roles being in the classics and in the lead-out train for Caleb Ewan.

Major results 
2020
 1st  Road race, National Under-23 Road Championships
2021 
 4th Overall Flanders Tomorrow Tour
2022
 1st  Mountains classification, Tour de Pologne

Grand Tour general classification results timeline

References

External links 
 

1999 births
Living people
Australian male cyclists
Cyclists from Adelaide